Hyde North is a railway station north of Hyde, Greater Manchester, England, operated by Northern Trains.

Originally opened as Hyde Junction in February 1863, it was at the junction between the Manchester, Sheffield and Lincolnshire Railway extension to  New Mills (operated jointly with the Midland Railway as the Sheffield and Midland Railway Companies' Committee) and the MS&L main line through Penistone to Sheffield).  For a while it saw the Midland's expresses from London. In 1875, however, a new more direct route was built through Bredbury. On 17 September 1951, the station was renamed Hyde North.

Hyde North Junction accident 

The junction just outside the station was the scene of a crash on 22 August 1990 when, at around 09:50, two trains collided across the single lead junction where the two routes diverged: the 09:33 from Rose Hill to Manchester Piccadilly and the 09:36 from Manchester Piccadilly to Sheffield.  Of the 42 passengers, there were 28 minor injuries.  The official report found that the driver of the Rose Hill train had inadvertently passed a signal set at danger and passed onto the short section of single track between the platform end and the junction points where the collision took place.  The report also concluded that the driver had not received adequate training.

Services
Hyde North only has platforms on the non-electrified tracks towards New Mills Central.  The electrified tracks carry EMU trains from Manchester Piccadilly to Glossop and Hadfield behind the station.  Despite the station's former name, Hyde Junction, suggesting that passengers had a choice of routes, there never were platforms on the Glossop line here; trains call instead at nearby Flowery Field station.

Hyde North is served by generally hourly services in each direction on Mondays to Saturdays, operated by DMUs on the route between Piccadilly and Rose Hill Marple. There is no Sunday service.

In July 2020, Northern informed local residents that services between Manchester Piccadilly and Rose Hill Marple would not operate between early September and mid-December 2020; this was due to the effects of the COVID-19 pandemic on their workforce.  Although disruption occurred, the service was restored soon afterwards.

References

External links

Railway stations in Tameside
DfT Category F2 stations
Former Great Central and Midland Joint Railway stations
Railway stations in Great Britain opened in 1863
Northern franchise railway stations
Hyde, Greater Manchester
1863 establishments in England